Roger Wood may refer to:
Roger Wood (governor) (died 1654), governor of Bermuda, 1629–1637
Roger Wood (journalist) (1925–2012), Belgian-born British editor
Roger Leigh-Wood (1906–1987), English Olympic athlete
[[Roger Wood] (2008 - present), Great British detective